Paula García Romero (born 12 June 1999) is a Spanish footballer who plays as a defender for Sporting de Huelva.

Club career
García started her career at Atlético Madrid's academy.

References

External links
Profile at La Liga

1999 births
Living people
Women's association football defenders
Spanish women's footballers
Footballers from Madrid
Atlético Madrid Femenino players
Sporting de Huelva players
Primera División (women) players
Segunda Federación (women) players
21st-century Spanish women